Arctostaphylos auriculata (Mount Diablo manzanita) is an endangered species of Arctostaphylos endemic to California, and limited in geography to the area surrounding Mount Diablo, in Contra Costa County.

Description
Arctostaphylos auriculata is a woody shrub 1–4.5 m high with serpentine, glandless stems covered in white hair. The short [1.5-4.5 cm], silvery leaves overlap and have deeply lobed bases. It flowers densely in white February through May. The fruit is also hairy and small (5–10 mm). The Mount Diablo manzanita has no basal burl for regrowth and must propagate by seed.

Distribution
Growing in sandstone chaparral around 150-650 meter elevation, the thick undergrowth of Mount Diablo manzanita is often accompanied by poison oak or California wild grapes.

See also
California chaparral and woodlands
California montane chaparral and woodlands
California interior chaparral and woodlands

References

W. L. Jepson. 1951. A Manual of the Flowering Plants of California, p. 750.
Coffey, Geoffrey.  "Sympathy for the devil -- tricks and treats on Mount Diablo." San Francisco Chronicle 25 Oct. 2003 : E-7.

External links
Jepson Flora Project: Arctostaphylos andersonii.
USDA Plants Profile;  Arctostaphylos auriculata
Arctostaphylos auriculata - Photo gallery

auriculata
Endemic flora of California
Mount Diablo
Natural history of the California chaparral and woodlands
Natural history of the California Coast Ranges
Natural history of Contra Costa County, California
Taxa named by Alice Eastwood
Endemic flora of the San Francisco Bay Area